André Roligheten (born 2 January 1985) is a Norwegian jazz musician (saxophone) and composer, known from a series of recordings and bands like Albatrosh and Team Hegdal. He has also played with musicians like Andrew D'Angelo, Theo Bleckmann, Django Bates, John Edwards, Paul Lovens, Axel Dörner, Robin Hayward, Raymond Strid, Bugge Wesseltoft, Mathias Eick, Ola Kvernberg, Paal Nilssen-Love and Per Zanussi.

Career 

Roligheten was born in Skien, Norway, and started playing the saxophone at an early age. At only 8 years old he picked up the horn and soon figured it out. He earned a Bachelor's degree from the Jazzprogeram at Trondheim Musikkonsevatorium, under mentors like John Pål Inderberg and Erling Aksdal. In 2008 he finished his Master's degree in improvised music at the Norwegian Academy of Music in Oslo.

Roligheten have played on festivals like Moldejazz, Kongsberg Jazz Festival, Oslo Jazzfestival, North Sea Jazz Festival, Münster Jazz Festival, Süd Tyrol Jazz Festival, 12 Points, Dølajazz, Nattjazz, Jazzfest, MaiJazz, Soddjazz, Vossajazz, and done several tours in Scandinavia, Germany, Poland, Czech Republic, Slovenia, France, Italy, China and US.

Galleri

Honors 
2008: Young Nordic Jazz Comets, Soloist prize
2009: 1st prize – "Best Band" at the European Jazz Competition
2012: JazZtipend, awarded by SpareBank 1, Midtnorsk Jazzsenter in Trondheim and Moldejazz
2015: Norwegian Grammy, Spellemannprisen 2015, "Jazz" Team Hegdal "Vol.3"

Discography 

Roligheten
2017: Homegrown (Clean Feed Records)

Albatrosh
2009: Seagull Island (Inner Ear)
2010: Mystery Orchestra with Grenager & Tafjord (Inner Ear)
2011: Yonkers (Rune Grammofon)
2014: Night Owl (Rune Grammofon)

Team Hegdal
2010: Vol 1 (Øra Fonogram)
2011: Vol 2 (Øra Fonogram)
2015: Vol 3 (Particular Recordings)
2017: Vol 4 (Particular Recordings)

Gard Nilssen´s Acoustic Unity, trio including Petter Eldh
2015: Firehouse (Clean Feed Records)
2017: Live in Europe (Clean Feed Records)
2019: To Whom Who Buys a Record (ODIN)

"Friends & Neighbors»
2011: No Beat Policy (Øra Fonogram)
2014: Hymn For A Hungry Nation (Clean Feed Records)
2016: What´s Wrong? (Clean Feed Records)

With Trondheim Jazz Orchestra
2011: Kinetic Music (MNJ Records), with Magic Pocket
2013: Tree House (MNJ Records), with Albatrosh
2015: Savages (Propeller Recordings), with Kristoffer Lo

With Susanne Sundfør
2017: Music For People In Trouble (Sonnet Sound Ltd distributed by Warner Music Norway AS)

With Motorpsycho & Ståle Storløkken
2012: The Death Defying Unicorn (Stickman Records, Germany)

Jonas Cambien Trio
2016: A Zoology of the Future (Clean Feed Records)

With Eyolf Dale
2016: Wolf Valley (Edition Records Ltd.)

Rune Your Day
2017: Rune Your Day (Clean Feed Records)

Waldemar 4
2015: Waldemar 4 (Gigaforn)

Damana
2016: Cornua Copiae (Clean Feed Records)

With Hanne Kolstø
2012: Flashblack (Karmakosmetix)
2015: While We Still Have Light (Jansen Plateproduksjon)

With "Machina» (including with Kristoffer Lo)
2011: So Much For Dancing (Øra Fonogram)

With "The Great Big Taters»
2011: Fake It 'Till You Make It (Dayladore Collective)

References

External links 

Norwegian jazz saxophonists
Norwegian jazz composers
Norwegian University of Science and Technology alumni
Musicians from Skien
1985 births
Living people
21st-century saxophonists
Ensemble Denada members
Edition Records artists
Rune Grammofon artists
Clean Feed Records artists